This is a list of Pepperdine Waves football players in the NFL Draft.

Key

Selections 

* Pick was made as part of the original AFL draft to stock the new league.** Pick was made in the regular AFL draft (1961–1966).*** Pick was made in the AFL Redshirt draft (1965–1966).

References

Pepperdine

Pepperdine Waves NFL Draft